Forge Mill Lake is a local nature reserve in Sandwell Valley, near West Bromwich in West Midlands, England. It is within Sandwell Valley Country Park.

Description
The site, area , is owned and managed by Sandwell Metropolitan Borough Council, and was declared a local nature reserve (LNR) in 1991. Part of the site, including one of the two islands in the lake, is managed by the RSPB as part of the adjacent Sandwell Valley RSPB reserve.

The lake is alongside the River Tame. There is a footpath around the lake; wildflower meadows and woodland plantations are linked to  it by pathways, a cycleway and bridleway. There is a visitor centre at Forge Mill Farm.

Wildfowl and other species can be seen on the lake; in winter, wigeon, snipe, water rail and other rarer birds are there. In spring and autumn, migrant birds pass through and rarities may be seen.

As of 2020, the lake is being remodelled and its capacity increased as part of the "Perry Barr and Witton flood risk management scheme".

References

External links
 Finding your way around Sandwell Valley (RSPB leaflet)

Local Nature Reserves in the West Midlands (county)
Lakes of the West Midlands (county)
Parks and open spaces in the West Midlands (county)